The Macedonian-Australian People's League or MAPL was a procommunist Macedonian Australian political organisation which operated from 1946 to 1957. The organisation had branches open in every major Macedonian settlement in Australia.

Foundation
On 24 and 25 August the Macedonian Community in Perth, Edinstvo, held a national conference where member from all Macedonian communities in Australia were invited to. The decision was made that a national organisation should be established for the Macedonians in Australia. The Conference of 25 August 1946 brought forward a number of resolutions of;

firstly, that a Macedonian league be organised incorporating the organisations in attendance and that the committee elected undertake to incorporate all Macedonian organisation in Australia
secondly, that a migrant newspaper be produced in Macedonian
thirdly, that action be taken to organise an appeal among Australian Macedonian migrants for a hospital building and equipment in the newly created Republic of Macedonia

Kiro Angelcoff was elected as the group's first president. A gifted orator he travelled to Adelaide, Melbourne, Crabbes Creek, Shepparton, Port Kembla, Newcastle, Queanbeyan and many other places organising the existing groups and creating new ones. He soon gained the nickname The Organizer.

The first regular convention was held on 7 to 9 March 1947 in Melbourne. The convention was attended by members from all Macedonian organisations in Australia. It was here that the organization formally adopted the name, "Macedonian Australian People's League" and elected a national committee to conduct its coordinated affairs. It brought forward its constitution by which this national organisation would run its affairs and also resolved that a target of £10,000 be raised towards the Hospital Appeal.

The National Committee elected in 1947 was as follows; President - Kiro Angelcoff, Vice-President - Stojan Sarbinoff, Secretary and Editor - Ilo Malkov, Treasurer - Mick Veloski.

Organisation
The Macedonian-Australian People's League dominated Macedonian community life for over 10 years. There were branches wherever there was a group of Macedonians. A flurry of Picnics, Dances, fund-raisers and community unity followed. 9 months after the committee had been formed an estimate 53 groups had joined the Macedonian-Australian People's League.

The branch in Adelaide was formed under the name of "Alexander the Great", with Vasil Apostol as the president. In 1951 a youth wing was formed by Kosta Radin and Kosta Kiosses.

Many branches of the MAPL were established in New South Wales. The Queanbeyan Branch was called "Mladi Goce" after the name of the commander of the First Aegean Partisan Brigade. The branch of the MAPL in Crabbes Creek was known as Sloboda/Freedom was first opened in 1947. Other branches opened in Bonnyrigg, Port Kembla, Forbes, Richmond, Queanbeyan, Port Kembla, Braidwood, Captains Flat, Beechwood and Newcastle. Two the groups of Sydney, "Vesela Makedonija" and Richmond, "Kotori" often collaborated. They often held picnics in the Royal National Park or joint fundraisers. In the annual soccer game "Vesela Makedonija" beat "Kotori" 4:3.

The Perth group, "Edinstvo" was one of the most active branches of the community. Originally the first group to publish the "Makedonska Iskra" newspaper. The Macedonian organisation in Manjimup, Sloboba eventually joined the League. Other branches were formed in Geraldton, Wanneroo, Kalgoorlie and Port Headland.

In 1948 a branch in Brisbane was founded.

The hospital appeals
Macedonian Migrants in all corners of the world had commenced an appeal to raise funds in an effort to assist the Macedonians in Macedonia to build hospitals and medical centres. The  Macedonian-Australian People's League went on to play a major part in this campaign. One of the organization's resolutions was to raise funds for this campaign. A sub-committee was elected to organise the fund raising in 1946; its president was Phillip Jumbazoff. There were three main appeals, one in 1947, one in 1948 and the last in 1949.

In 1947 the committee held a "Miss Macedonia" beauty pageant. The candidates were Connie Pappas, Paula Veloska, Tina Malco, Dana Gatsos, Lina Raicos and Pam Ognenis. Dana Gatsos was crowned as the inaugural Miss Macedonia.

The MAPL set a fund-raising target of £10,000. The first sum of £1,500 was forwarded to Skopje on 13 March 1947. This was four days after the inaugural conference of the league. Most of the money raised was from Western Australia where the MAPL was most prominent. The League raise a total of £11,024 which £3,791 was from NSW, £1,350 from Victoria, £320 from South Australia and £5,563 from Western Australia.  A total of $154,000 was raised by Macedonian Migrants all over the world.

The following inscription appears on a plaque at the hospital in Skopje a tribute to the Macedonian Diaspora.
"The Buildings and equipping of this clinic block was possible due to the help of the Migrants of Macedonian origin settled in the USA, Canada, South America and Australia.
In the foundations of this building are laid the love of Macedonian migrants for their free homeland and our deep thankyous"

A second call for donations was announced in early 1948. Within New South Wales a pro rata system was set up in order to raise funds more efficiently. The Crabbes Creek branch went on to raise over £270, Sydney - £100 and Newcastle £75. The Richmond, Queanbeyan and Port Kembla branches were closely behind. Once again the West Australian branches raised the most money. The first donations from Queensland also began to flow in 1948.

The Third Hospital Appeal was called in 1949. This was by far the largest and most successful. In New South Wales the Crabbes Creek branch went on to raise £819, while Port Kembla came in second at over £420. The Katoomba branch raised over £115.

Makedonska Iskra

"Macedonian Spark" or "Makedonska Iskra" was the first national Macedonian newspaper in Australia. It was original the journal of the Perth Group, "Edinstvo" but was then expanded to rest of Australia. The "Makedonska Iskra" newspaper was the organ of the MAPL. It was extremely active in raising funds for the Hospital Appeal. The Newspaper published information on all of the Macedonian events that were happenind in Australia. The paper was written in Vernacular rather than Standard Macedonian. Communities would often raise money to help fund the paper.

"Makedonska Iskra" was printed monthly, initially in Perth. It moved to Sydney in 1948 and eventually to Melbourne from 1953 to 1957. The paper achieve considerable success in Australia and the rest of the world. Copies of Makedonska Iskra were posted to America, Canada and to the Socialist Republic of Macedonia. The newspaper is now a record of key historical events that shaped the Macedonian nation and of the many people and events within the Macedonian community in Australia.

Macedonian Australian Ex-Servicemen's League
The Macedonian Australian Ex-Servicemen's League was another organisation that was founded by the Macedonian-Australian People's League. It would survive the decentralisation of the Macedonian-Australian People's League. It was founded in late 1947 by Mick Veloskey and Ilija Malkov. The Macedonian Australian Ex-Servicemen's League is still active.

Decentralisation
At the 6th National Conference in Melbourne on 6/7 January 1957, the Macedonian-Australian People's League resolved to dencentralize; each branch was to seek incorporation at state level.

Since the Macedonian-Australian People's League there has been no unified Macedonian Organisation in Australia. The "Macedonian Community of Western Australia" and "Macedonian Community of South Australia" were formed after the MAPL disbanded. Other groups are often divided and a major split occurred in the 1970s and 1980s in Many Macedonian Communities. Although some attempts of unification have been made such as the foundation of the "Federation of Macedonian Cultural and Artistic societies in Victoria" or FOMKUDV and the "Federation of Macedonian Associations in Victoria" or FOMAV.

See also
Macedonian Australians
Macedonian Patriotic Organization
Macedonian Diaspora

References

External links
Makedonska Iskra Newspaper Online

Socialist organisations in Australia
Macedonian-Australian culture